The Canton of Bénévent-l’Abbaye was a canton situated in the Creuse département and in the Limousin region of central France. It was disbanded following the French canton reorganisation which came into effect in March 2015. It consisted of 10 communes, which joined the canton of Le Grand-Bourg in 2015. It had 3,324 inhabitants (2012).

Geography 
An area of farming and forestry in the arrondissement of Guéret, centred on the town of Bénévent-l'Abbaye. The altitude varies from 294 m (Châtelus-le-Marcheix) to 693 m (Saint-Goussaud) with an average altitude of 459 m.

The canton comprised 10 communes:

Arrènes
Augères
Aulon
Azat-Châtenet
Bénévent-l'Abbaye
Ceyroux
Châtelus-le-Marcheix
Marsac
Mourioux-Vieilleville
Saint-Goussaud

Population

See also 
 Arrondissements of the Creuse department
 Cantons of the Creuse department
 Communes of the Creuse department

References 

Benevent-l'Abbaye
2015 disestablishments in France
States and territories disestablished in 2015